Diane Dufresne,  (born 30 September 1944) is a French Canadian singer and painter, and is known for singing a large repertoire of popular Quebec songs.

Dufresne was born in Montreal, Quebec, Canada. She lived in Paris from 1965 to 1967 where she studied voice with Jean Lumière and dramatic art with Françoise Rosay. While there, she performed in noted boîte à chansons such as l'Écluse, l'Échelle de Jacob, and le Caveau de la Bolée.

On her return to Montreal, she began a collaboration with composer , and lyricist Luc Plamondon.

In March 2019, she was one of 11 singers from Quebec, alongside Ginette Reno, Céline Dion, Isabelle Boulay, Luce Dufault, Louise Forestier, Laurence Jalbert, Catherine Major, Ariane Moffatt, Marie Denise Pelletier and Marie-Élaine Thibert, who participated in a supergroup recording of Renée Claude's 1971 single "Tu trouveras la paix" after Claude's diagnosis with Alzheimer's disease was announced.

Awards and recognition
 1987 – Félix Award, best pop show: Top Secret
 2001 – Governor General's Performing Arts Award, Canada's highest honour in the performing arts
 2002 – Made a knight of the National Order of Quebec
 2006 – Félix Hommage for her lifetime achievements
 2008 – Legion of Honour by France 
 2015 – Appointed as a member of the Order of Canada

Discography
 1969 – L'initiation
 1972 – Tiens-toé ben, j'arrive
 1973 – À part de d'ça, j'me sens ben
 1974 – 12 succès pop
 1975 – Sur la même longueur d'ondes
 1975 – Mon premier show (en public)
 1977 – Maman, si tu m'voyais... tu s'rais fière de ta fille!
 1978 – Olympia '78, volume 1 et 2
 1978 – Starmania
 1979 – Starmania, le spectacle
 1979 – Striptease
 1982 – Turbulences
 1984 – Dioxine de carbone et son rayon rose
 1984 – Magie rose (en public)
 1985 – Chanteurs sans frontières (special participation)
 1986 – Follement vôtre
 1987 – Top secret
 1988 – Master série en 2 volumes (compilation album)
 1991 – Sans dessous dessus (compilation album)
 1993 – Détournement majeur
 1997 – Diane Dufresne
 2000 – Merci (compilation album: Quebec)
 2002 – Merci (compilation album: France)
 2005 – Diane Dufresne chante Kurt Weill, with Yannick Nézet-Séguin
 2007 – Effusions, accompanied by Alain Lefèvre
 2018 – Meilleur Après

Shows
 1987 – Top Secret
 2002 – En liberté conditionnelle
 2004 – Symphonie de Kurt Weill (single concert)
 2006 – Plurielle en Quatre Tableaux

See also
List of Quebec musicians
Music of Quebec
Culture of Quebec

References

External links
 
 The Canadian Encyclopedia: Diane Dufresne
 Genealogy: Diane Dufresne

1944 births
Living people
French Quebecers
Knights of the National Order of Quebec
Artists from Montreal
Singers from Montreal
French-language singers of Canada
Governor General's Performing Arts Award winners
Canadian women pop singers
Members of the Order of Canada
20th-century Canadian women singers
21st-century Canadian women singers
Félix Award winners